Harry Julius Larsen (4 September 1915 – 12 August 1974) was a Danish rower who competed in the 1936 Summer Olympics.

Larsen was born in Kirkerup, Slagelse Municipality, in 1915. In 1936 he won the silver medal with his partner Richard Olsen in the coxless pair competition. He died in 1974 in Copenhagen.

References

External links
 Database Olympics profile

1915 births
1974 deaths
Danish male rowers
Olympic rowers of Denmark
Rowers at the 1936 Summer Olympics
Olympic silver medalists for Denmark
Olympic medalists in rowing
Medalists at the 1936 Summer Olympics
European Rowing Championships medalists
People from Slagelse Municipality
Sportspeople from Region Zealand